N-Phenethylnormorphine is an opioid analgesic drug derived from morphine by replacing the N-methyl group with β-phenethyl. It is around eight to fourteen times more potent than morphine as a result of this modification, in contrast to most other N-substituted derivatives of morphine, which are substantially less active, or act as antagonists. Binding studies have helped to explain the increased potency of N-phenethylnormorphine, showing that the phenethyl group extends out to reach an additional binding point deeper inside the μ-opioid receptor cleft, analogous to the binding of the phenethyl group on fentanyl.

See also 
 14-Cinnamoyloxycodeinone
 14-Phenylpropoxymetopon
 7-PET
 MR-2096
 N-Phenethyl-14-ethoxymetopon
 N-Phenethylnordesomorphine
 Phenomorphan
 RAM-378
 Ro4-1539

References 

4,5-Epoxymorphinans
Semisynthetic opioids
Mu-opioid receptor agonists